Witness To Connection is the second  studio album made by The Morakestra and was released under the Indie label Stratking Records. The album was promoted in mainstream media and has given The Morakestra attention from critics and mainstream media. The album was recorded at different locations in Texas and is influenced by different genres and styles of music. The album contains genres that range from alt-country traces to psychedelic guitar composition. Witness To Connection marked the change to a stable lineup for The Morakestra and was joined in post production by the other members to complement and polish the live aspect and future compositions.

Credits

Produced and Engineered By: Jim Ward, Gabriel Gonzalez
Assistant Engineers Rick Chavarria, Justin Leah at Sonic Ranch Studios
Mastered by: Marco A. Ramirez at Sonic Ranch Studios.
Recorded at Sonic Ranch Studios in Tornillo, Texas and Rosewood Studios, El Paso, TX and Casa de Jim, El Paso, TX.
Design by: Daniel Pérlaky for City On Fire
Line illustrations by: Jacob Cass.

Track listing
All songs written by William Mora and David Mora
"Angels" – 2:42
"Tell You Something" – 3:09
"Tonight" – 2:42
"Spacebar" - 2:47
"Goodbye" – 3:04
"Butterfly" – 2:46
"English Channel" - 3:40
"Hollywood" – 2:19
"Sunshine" – 3:18
"Perfect Memory" – 2:30
"Different Names" – 4:16

References

2009 albums
Albums recorded at Sonic Ranch